Marta Anna Wcisło (born 26 February 1969) is a Polish educator, politician and member of the Civic Platform, a centre-right party. She has been a member of the Sejm since 12 November 2019 after winning 15,062 votes in the 2019 Polish parliamentary elections.

See also

9th term Sejm and 10th term Senate of Poland
List of Sejm members (2019–23)

References

Living people
1969 births
Civic Platform politicians
Members of the Polish Sejm 2019–2023
21st-century Polish women politicians
Maria Curie-Skłodowska University alumni
People from Kraśnik